The UAE Royals were a tennis team based in Dubai, United Arab Emirates that competed in the International Premier Tennis League (IPTL). It is one of four charter franchises that participated in the IPTL's inaugural 2014 season where it finished as runners-up. The team started its 2015 season with marquee signings in Roger Federer and Ana Ivanovic.

Team history

Founding of franchise
On 21 January 2014, IPTL announced that one of the charter franchises for the league's inaugural 2014 season would be based in the Middle East. On 2 March 2014, IPTL revealed that the Middle East franchise would play its home matches in Dubai, United Arab Emirates. The team is owned by Neelesh Bhatnagar, a leading Dubai-based businessman, and Sachin Gadoya, managing director of Musafir.com, an Internet-based travel agency. Indian cricketer Virat Kohli was also introduced as the co-owner of the franchise on September 10, 2015.

Inaugural draft
The Dubai franchise participated in the IPTL inaugural draft on 2 March 2014, in Dubai, United Arab Emirates. Players selected by Dubai were

Team name
By May 2014, the team was being referred to as the UAE Falcons. By June 2014, the Falcons had become known as the UAE Royals.

Home venue
The UAE Royals will play their home matches at the Dubai Duty Free Stadium for the 2015 season. The team played their home matches at the Hamdan bin Mohammed bin Rashid Sports Complex during the first season of the league.

First coach
On 27 October 2014, John-Laffnie de Jager was named the Royals' first coach.

Inaugural season

The Royals opened their inaugural season with a road match on 28 November 2014, against the Manila Mavericks in Pasay, Metropolitan Manila, Philippines. It played its first home match on 11 December 2014, also against the Mavericks.

Television coverage
On 22 August 2014, IPTL announced it had reached an agreement for the Middle East and North Africa television broadcasting rights with Abu Dhabi Media. The rights continue with Abu Dhabi Media for 2015 season.

Current roster

See also

References

External links
 
 International Premier Tennis League official website

International Premier Tennis League teams
Royals
Sports clubs established in 2014
2014 establishments in the United Arab Emirates